Rhodopseudomonas harwoodiae is a bacterium from the genus of Rhodopseudomonas.

References

External links
Type strain of Rhodopseudomonas harwoodiae at BacDive -  the Bacterial Diversity Metadatabase

Nitrobacteraceae
Bacteria described in 2012